Hoyle's agar is a selective medium that uses tellurite to differentially select Corynebacterium diphtheriae from other upper respiratory tract flora. The medium appears cream to yellow colored, and takes the form of a free-floating powder. It is a modification of Neill's medium.

Hoyle's tellurite agar contains:

The medium inhibits growth of Gram-negative bacteria and many Gram-positive bacteria, and reduction of the tellurite is characteristic of corynebacteria (though not entirely exclusive to them.) Microscopic examination of samples of suspected colonies, using Neisser differential staining, is required for confirmation.

References

Microbiological media